USS Charlton Hall (ID-1359) was a cargo steamship that was built in Scotland in 1907 and served in the merchant fleets of the United Kingdom, United States and Greece. She served in the United States Navy in 1918. She was renamed Atlantis and then Anastasis in 1930. She was scrapped in China in 1934.

Building and first owner
William Hamilton and Company built the ship in Port Glasgow on the River Clyde, launching her on 14 May 1907.

The ship's first owners were Charles G Dunn and Company of Liverpool, who named all their ships after English country houses whose name ended in "Hall". She was named after Charlton Hall, Northumberland. Dunn & Co registered her at Liverpool. Her United Kingdom official number was 124071 and her code letters were HLBP.

US ownership
In 1914 the United States Steel Products Co bought three of CG Dunn's ships: Charlton Hall,  and Crofton Hall, and registered them in New York. Her US official number was 212853 and her code letters were LDQB. By 1917 she was equipped for wireless telegraphy. By 1918 her call sign was KLU.

On 10 June 1918 the United States Shipping Board transferred Charlton Hall to the US Navy. On 14 June she was commissioned into the Navy as USS Charlton Hall, with the Identification Number (ID) 1359. She was defensively armed with one 5-inch/40-caliber gun and one 3-inch/50-caliber gun.

She made three voyages for the Naval Overseas Transportation Service, taking supplies for the American Expeditionary Forces from New York to France. She began her first voyage on 11 June and completed the last on 23 December 1918, six weeks after the Armistice of 11 November 1918. On 29 January 1919 the Navy decommissioned Charlton Hall at Newport News, Virginia. On 3 February she was transferred to the US Shipping Board at New York City, who returned her to her owner.

Greek ownership
By 1930 an M Kulukundis had bought Charlton Hall, renamed her Atlantis and registered her on the Aegean island of Syra in Greece. This may have been the Greek ship-owner Manuel Kulukundis, who founded Rethymnis & Kulukundis and Counties Ship Management in London.

Before the end of 1930, Kulukundis sold the ship on to K Psychas, who renamed her Anastasis. By 1933 her code letters were JHDD. On 4 April 1934 Anastasis arrived in Shanghai to be scrapped.

References

Bibliography

External links

1907 ships
Cargo ships of the United States Navy
Cargo ships of Greece
Merchant ships of the United Kingdom
Merchant ships of the United States
Ships built on the River Clyde
Steamships of Greece
Steamships of the United Kingdom
Steamships of the United States
World War I cargo ships of the United States